Aero Trasporti Italiani Flight 460 was a scheduled passenger flight between Milan Linate Airport in Milan, Italy and Cologne Bonn Airport in Cologne, Germany on 15 October 1987. The flight was operated by Aero Trasporti Italiani (ATI), a subsidiary of Alitalia, using an ATR-42 turboprop aircraft.

Icing conditions existed at the time and fifteen minutes after takeoff, while climbing through FL147 in IAS hold mode (constant speed set at ) the aircraft rolled left and right before crashing nose down into a  mountain following an uncontrolled descent. All 37 onboard the aircraft were killed.

Accident
Flight 460 took off from Milan-Linate airport at 7.13 pm, 53 minutes later than scheduled due to traffic and poor weather conditions. During the movements, three anomalous pitch trim movements were made setting the elevator pitch to down, preventing a recovery. Moments before the aircraft disappeared from radar, the pilot contacted air traffic control to declare a mayday. The aircraft crashed nose down into Mount Crezzo, near Lake Como, following an uncontrolled descent.

Aircraft
The aircraft involved in the accident was an Aerospatiale ATR 42-312, serial number 046, which held the registration I-ATRH and named "Città di Verona".  It was delivered brand new to ATI on 14 May 1987. It was powered by two Pratt and Whitney PW120 turbo propeller engines. The aircraft was manufactured in Toulouse, France and held the test registration of F-WWEZ prior to delivery. Its first test flight was made on 24 April 1987.

Crew and passengers
Flight 460 had a crew of three. Lamberto Laine (43) was the pilot, Pierluigi Lampronti (29) was the co-pilot and Carla Corneliani (35) was the flight attendant.

Originally, 46 seats on the aircraft had been sold however only 30 passengers with reservations arrived on time. With the delay, a further 4 passengers were able to board the aircraft. One notable passenger was German racing driver and two time Nürburgring 24 Hours champion, Axel Felder.

Investigation
Local eye-witness reports suggested that the aircraft had crashed into a mountain in the Mount Crezzo area of the alps, near Lake Como and the towns of Magreglio and Barni. Local weather conditions at the time were poor, heavy rain in the area of the crash. Early searching for the aircraft was completed by rescue workers beaming a spotlight on the mountainside from the lakefront at Onno.

By the day following the crash, investigators located the aircraft and all 37 passengers and crew. They confirmed there were no survivors. At the same time one of the two black boxes was recovered.  The following day, the second black box was recovered from the crash site.
	
Investigations by the Carabinieri Investigative Unit of the Provincial Command of Como and the Air Force showed that the weather conditions had caused the formation of ice on the wings of the ATR 42. The crew had failed to understand that the ice and the low speed would have stalled the plane, some manoeuvres to regain speed and probably a problem in the management of the trim led the plane to point towards the ground until it crashed into the mountain.

An investigation of the judiciary led to a trial that saw the designer of the ATR 42 aircraft, Jean Rech, and three senior executives of ATI convicted for manslaughter. However, in 1995 these sentences were annulled and all four men were acquitted.

See also 

 American Eagle Flight 4184 
 Aero Caribbean Flight 883

References 

Aviation accidents and incidents in 1987
Accidents and incidents involving the ATR 42
Aviation accidents and incidents in Italy
1987 in Italy
November 1987 events in Europe
Airliner accidents and incidents caused by ice